Emil Vilhelm Lindewald (14 September 1858 – 13 May 1921) was a Swedish sport shooter who competed in the 1912 Summer Olympics.

He was born in Övergran, Håbo Municipality. In 1912 he finished eighth in the 100 metre running deer, double shots competition and 24th in the 100 metre running deer, single shots event.

References

1858 births
1921 deaths
People from Håbo Municipality
Swedish male sport shooters
Running target shooters
Olympic shooters of Sweden
Shooters at the 1912 Summer Olympics
Sportspeople from Uppsala County
20th-century Swedish people